Let Live & Let Ghosts is the debut studio album by American power pop band Jukebox the Ghost. The album was self-released on April 22, 2008. The band promoted it with a supporting slot on Nightmare of You's US tour.

Track listing

References 

2008 debut albums
Jukebox the Ghost albums